Maurice Hennequin (10 December 1863 – 3 September 1926) was a French-naturalized Belgian playwright.

Biography 
A great-grandson of the painter Philippe-Auguste Hennequin, Maurice Hennequin was the son of Alfred Hennequin (1842–1887), himself a playwright, who created a kind of vaudeville, with a complex plot but rigorously structured, nicknamed "hennequinade"  The young Maurice began in the world of theater at the age of 19 in 1882, sometimes helped by his father during his early years.

In a 45-year long career, he gave nearly a hundred plays, mostly comedies and vaudevilles, written either alone or in collaboration. Many of these works experienced vivid success, such as Le Système Ribadier, written in collaboration with Georges Feydeau, or Vous n'avez rien à déclarer ?, quoted by one character in the play A Flea in Her Ear by Feydeau, and twice adapted for film. Some of his plays even experienced real triumph, like Le Monsieur de cinq heures with 568 performances, which was considerable in his time.

He married mademoiselle Braem.

Works

Theatre

From 1885 to 1899 
1885: L'oiseau bleu, one-act comedy, premiered at the Théâtre de la Renaissance in Paris on 10 October
1885: Le sous-préfet de Nanterre, comedie in one act
1885: La Guerre joyeuse, opéra comique in three acts, adapted by Alfred and Maurice Hennequin, music by Johann Strauss
1886: Trop de vertu !, play in three acts by Alfred and Maurice Hennequin, first presented in Paris at the Théâtre du Palais-Royal, on 27 January
1886: Monsieur Irma, comedy in one act, premiered in Paris at the Théâtre de la Renaissance on 16 April. 
1887: Les Vacances du mariage, comedy in three acts, with Albin Valabrègue, premiered at the Théâtre des Menus-Plaisirs in Paris on 12 February.
1887: Les Oiseaux de passage, comedy in one act, premiered at the Théâtre du Parc in Brussels on 30 April.
1887: Le Marquis de Kersalec, comedy in one act
1888: Un mariage au téléphone, comedy in one act, first performed in Brussels at the Théâtre du Vaudeville on 31 January.
1889: Une Nuit orageuse
1889: Madame reçoit, comédie enfantine
1889: Pour un hanneton, comédie enfantine
1890: Un prix Montyon, comédie-vaudeville in three acts, with Albin Valabrègue, presented for the first time in Paris at the Théâtre du Palais-Royal on December.
1891: La Petite Poucette, vaudeville-opérette in three acts and five tableaux, with Maurice Ordonneau, music by Raoul Pugno, premiered at the Théâtre de la Renaissance in Paris on 5 March
1891: Le Château de M. Toulardot
1891: Fatal zéro
1891: Le Fluide de John
1891: Le Réveil du calife
1892: La Femme du commissaire, comédie-vaudeville in three acts with Maurice Ordonneau, premiered at the Théâtre de Cluny in Paris on 7 August.
1892: Le Système Ribadier, comedy in three acts, with Georges Feydeau, premiered at the Théâtre du Palais-Royal in Paris on 30 November, 78 performances, despite a fairly good review.
1892: Le Dragon.
1892: Une Enquête, comédy in one act
Inviolable !, comédie en vaudevilles in three acts, premiered at the Théâtre des Nouveautés in Paris on 11 April and in Brussels at the Théâtre du Vaudeville (Brussels) on 8 October 1897.
1894: Les Joies du foyer, comedy in three acts, first presented in Paris at the Théâtre du Palais-Royal on 1 September.
1894: Les Ricochets de l'amour, comedy in three acts, premiered at the Théâtre du Palais-Royal in Paris on 27 December.
1894: Son Secrétaire
1894: Le 3è Hussards, opéra comique in three acts, with Antony Mars
1896: Le Paradis, play in three acts, with Paul Bilhaud and A. Barré, premiered in Paris at the Théâtre du Palais-Royal on 3 April. 
Sa Majesté l'Amour, operetta in three acts, with Antony Mars, first presented at the Eldorado on 24 December
1897: Les Fêtards, operetta in three acts, music by Victor Roger, libretto by Antony Mars and Maurice Hennequin, created for the first time in Paris at the Théâtre du Palais-Royal on 28 October.
1898: Le Terre-Neuve, comedy in three acts, with Alexandre Bisson, premiered in Paris at the Théâtre du Palais-Royal on 26 February
1898: Place aux femmes !, comedy in four acts, with Albin Valabrègue, premiered in Paris at the Théâtre du Palais-Royal on 8 October.
1898: Le Voyage autour du Code, play in four acts, with Paul Bilhaud and Georges Duval
1898: Le Remplaçant, comedy in three acts, with Georges Duval and William Busnach
1899: La Poule blanche, operetta in four acts, with Antony Mars, music by Victor Roger, first performed at the Théâtre de Cluny on 13 January
1899: Coralie et Cie, play in three acts, with Albin Valabrègue, presented for the first time in Paris at the Théâtre du Palais-Royal on 30 November.

From 1900 to 1927 
1901: M'amour, comedy in three acts with Paul Bilhaud, premiered in Paris at the Théâtre du Palais-Royal on 22 January.
1901: Nelly Rozier, comedy en three acts, with Paul Bilhaud, premiered in Paris at the Théâtre des Nouveautés on 10 December.
1901: Le Coup de fouet, comédie en vaudevilles in three acts, with Paul Bilhaud and Georges Duval
1903: La Famille Boléro, play in three acts, with Paul Bilhaud, premiered in Paris at the Théâtre des Nouveautés on 13 February.
1903: Heureuse !, comedy in three acts, with Paul Bilhaud, first presented in Paris at the Théâtre du Vaudeville on 26 February.
1904: Les Dragées d'Hercule, play in three acts, with Paul Bilhaud, first performed in Paris at the Théâtre du Palais-Royal on 15 January.
1904: La Gueule du loup, comedy in three acte, with Paul Bilhaud, first presented in Paris at the Théâtre des Nouveautés on 28 October.
1905: Le Gant, comedy in one act, with Paul Bilhaud, premiered in Paris at the Théâtre du Palais-Royal on 22 April.
1905: Florette & Patapon, play in three acts, with Pierre Veber, first presented in Paris at the Théâtre des Nouveautés on 20 October.
1906: Totote et Boby, comedy in one act, first performed in Paris at the Théâtre du Palais-Royal on 3 October.
1906: Vous n'avez rien à déclarer ?, play in three acts, with Pierre Veber, first presented in Paris at the Théâtre des Nouveautés on 6 October.
1907: Vingt jours à l'ombre, play in three acts, with Pierre Veber, presented for the first time in Paris at the Théâtre des Nouveautés on 20 November.
1907: Patachon, four-act comedy, with Félix Duquesnel, premiered in Paris at the Théâtre du Vaudeville on 23 October.
1908: Crime passionnel !, one-act play, first performed in Monaco at the Théâtre des Beaux-Arts on 3 February.
1910: Noblesse oblige !, play in three acts, with Pierre Veber, first presented in Paris at the Théâtre des Nouveautés on 6 janvier.
1910: Une aventure impériale, comedy in one act, with Serge Basset, first performed in Paris at the Théâtre des Capucines on 10 February.
1910: Tais-toi, mon cœur !, play in three acts, with Pierre Veber, premiered in Paris at the Théâtre du Palais-Royal on 6 April.
1910: Yette, comedy in one act, first presented in Paris at the Théâtre des Capucines on 13 October.
1911: Une heure après, je le jure, comedy in one act, with Georges Mitchell, présented for the first time in Paris at the Théâtre des Capucines on 12 October.
1911: Aimé des femmes, comedy in three acts, with Georges Mitchell
1912: Une nuit d'amour, one-act play, with Serge Basset, first presented in Paris at the Théâtre du Grand Guignol on 24 March.
1912: Flirt pour deux !, comédie en un acte, représentée pour la première fois à Paris sur le Théâtre des Capucines on 3 October.
1912: La Présidente, play in three acts, with Pierre Veber, first presented in Paris at the Théâtre du Palais-Royal on 27 Novembre.
1913: Les Honneurs de la guerre, comedy in three acts
1913: Mon bébé, play in three acts after Baby mine by Margaret Mayo
1914: La Fille de Figaro, with Hughes Delorme, at the Théâtre de l'Apollo
1916: Madame et son filleul, comedy in three acts, with Pierre Veber
1916: La Petite Dactylo, with Georges Mitchell
1917: Le Compartiment des dames seules, play in three acts, with Georges Mitchell, first prformed in Paris at the Théâtre du Palais-Royal on 27 November.
1920: Et moi, j'te dis qu'elle t'a fait d'l'œil, play in three acts, with Pierre Veber
1921: Le Paradis fermé, comedy in three acts, with Romain Coolus, premiered in Paris at the Théâtre de l'Athénée on 2 November.
1922: La Seconde Nuit de noces, with Bilhaud and Veber
1922: La Sonnette d'alarme, comedy in three acts, with Romain Coolus, first presented in Paris at the Théâtre de l'Athénée on 1 December 
1922: Diane au bain, play in three acts, with Romain Coolus, at the Théâtre des Nouveautés
1924: Le Monsieur de cinq heures, play in three acts, with Pierre Veber, at the Théâtre du Palais-Royal
1926: Passionnément, musical comedy in three acts by Maurice Hennequin and Albert Willemetz, music by André Messager, Théâtre de la Michodière, on 16 January
1927: La reine de Biarritz, play in three acts, with Romain Coolus, at the Théâtre Antoine
1927: On ne roule pas Antoinette, play in three acts with Pierre Véber, at the théâtre du Palais-Royal
undated: Les Poches des autres, comedy in one act

Filmography 

Floretta and Patapon, directed by Mario Caserini (Italy, 1913, based on the play Florette & Patapon)
Madame Coralie & C. (Italy, 1914, based on the play Coralie et Cie) 
Madame la Presidente, directed by Frank Lloyd (1916, based on the play La Présidente) 
Amor mio!, directed by Eleuterio Rodolfi (Italy, 1916, based on the play M'amour) 
Gli onori della guerra, directed by Baldassarre Negroni (Italy, 1917, based on the play Les Honneurs de la guerre) 
, directed by Gennaro Righelli (Italy, 1918, based on the play Vingt jours à l'ombre) 
Noblesse oblige, directed by Marcello Dudovich (Italy, 1918, based on the play Noblesse oblige) 
Madame et son filleul, directed by Georges Monca and Charles Prince (France, 1919, based on the play Madame et son filleul) 
, directed by Baldassarre Negroni (Italy, 1920, based on the play Les Joies du foyer) 
La gola del lupo, directed by Torello Rolli (Italy, 1923, based on the play La Gueule du loup) 
Largo alle donne!, directed by Guido Brignone (Italy, 1924, based on the play Place aux femmes!) 

The Gay Deceiver, directed by John M. Stahl (1926, based on the play Patachon) 
A Kiss in a Taxi, directed by Clarence G. Badger (1927, based on the play Le Monsieur de cinq heures) 

Floretta and Patapon, directed by Amleto Palermi (Italy, 1927, based on the play Florette & Patapon) 
Su última noche, directed by Chester Franklin and Carlos F. Borcosque (1931, based on the play Patachon) 
, directed by René Guissart and Louis Mercanton (France, 1932, based on the operetta Passionnément) 

Coralie et Cie, directed by Alberto Cavalcanti (France, 1934, based on the play Coralie et Cie) 
The Queen of Biarritz, directed by Jean Toulout (France, 1934, based on the play La reine de Biarritz) 
, directed by Christian-Jaque (France, 1935, based on the play Le Compartiment des dames seules) 
, directed by Christian-Jaque (France, 1935, based on the play La Sonnette d'alarme) 
Et moi, j'te dis qu'elle t'a fait de l'œil, directed by Jack Forrester (France, 1935, based on the play Et moi, j'te dis qu'elle t'a fait d'l'œil) 
You Can't Fool Antoinette, directed by Paul Madeux (France, 1936, based on the play On ne roule pas Antoinette) 
Vous n'avez rien à déclarer?, directed by Léo Joannon (France, 1937, based on the play Vous n'avez rien à déclarer?) 
, directed by Maurice Cammage (France, 1937, based on the play Le Paradis) 
Le Monsieur de cinq heures, directed by Pierre Caron (France, 1938, based on the play Le Monsieur de cinq heures) 
La Présidente, directed by Fernand Rivers (France, 1938, based on the play La Présidente) 
Mi suegra es una fiera, directed by Luis Bayón Herrera (Argentina, 1939, based on the play Le Compartiment des dames seules) 
Et moi, j'te dis qu'elle t'a fait de l'œil, directed by Maurice Gleize (France, 1950, based on the play Et moi, j'te dis qu'elle t'a fait d'l'œil) 
, directed by Mario C. Lugones (Argentina, 1951, based on the play Le Monsieur de cinq heures) 
Mademoiselle Gobete, directed by Pietro Germi (Italy, 1952, based on the play La Présidente) 
, directed by Enrique Carreras (Argentina, 1953, based on the play Le Compartiment des dames seules) 
El Calavera, directed by Carlos F. Borcosque (Argentina, 1954, based on the play Les Joies du foyer) 
Vous n'avez rien à déclarer?, directed by Clément Duhour (France, 1959, based on the play Vous n'avez rien à déclarer?) 
Le pillole di Ercole, directed by Luciano Salce (Italy, 1960, based on the play Les Dragées d'Hercule) 
La Presidentessa, directed by Luciano Salce (Italy, 1977, based on the play La Présidente)

References

Bibliography

External links 

 Maurice Hennequin on data.bnf.fr
 Maurice Hennequin on les Archives du Spectacle.net
 

19th-century French dramatists and playwrights
20th-century French dramatists and playwrights
Writers from Liège
1863 births
1926 deaths